Copeland is an unincorporated community in Bath County, Virginia, in the United States.

References

Unincorporated communities in Bath County, Virginia
Unincorporated communities in Virginia